Springwater is a hamlet and census-designated place in the town of Springwater, Livingston County, New York, United States. Its population was 549 as of the 2010 census. New York State Routes 15 and 15A intersect in the community.

Geography
Springwater hamlet is in southeastern Livingston County, slightly northwest of the center of the town of Springwater. The hamlet is in the Springwater Valley, along Springwater Creek, which flows north  to Hemlock Lake, one of New York's Finger Lakes.

Demographics

References

Hamlets in Livingston County, New York
Hamlets in New York (state)
Census-designated places in Livingston County, New York
Census-designated places in New York (state)